Dinmore is a geographically small civil parish in Herefordshire, England.  The parish had an estimated population in mid-2010 of 7, the smallest in the county.

History

The manor house was before Henry VIII the Preceptory of the Knights of St John of Jerusalem incorporates 1189 are part of its manor house grounds. The preceptory's construction coincided with the advent of the common law and King Richard the Lionheart's reign who among counties and countries he saw, relatively often visited Herefordshire.  The Knights were Hospitallers in the vanguard of the Crusades, whose order also helped fund the wars.  The house has replaced the Norman England-built preceptory.

In the grounds of this manor which replaced the preceptory's own farm is its ruined chapel which was in the late nineteenth century (heavily) restored and cut in length, seating 50. The chapel was built in the 14th century during the Hundred Years War. It retains a recessed spire in the west tower.

Acres
The parish has .  A large minority is woodland. It rises to 210 m a short distance west of the present manor (preceptory). The lowest part, the east, sharply drops to the course of the upper River Lugg above Hereford which it flows through. It runs at about 60 m above sea level.

Farms
The main buildings in the parish are Dinmore Manor which operates a racehorse business and Upper Dinmore and Kipperknowle Farms, home of a herd of pedigree Limousin cattle.

See also
Dinmore Hill
Dinmore Tunnel
Hope under Dinmore

References

External links

Civil parishes in Herefordshire